The Hundred of Tatiara is a Hundred of the County of Buckingham centered on Bordertown, and Wolseley, South Australia.

References

Tatiara